Local elections were held in Taiwan on 26 November and to be held on 18 December 2022 to elect county magistrates (city mayors), county (city) councilors, township mayors, township councilors and chiefs of village (borough) in 6 municipalities and 16 counties (cities). Elected officials would serve a four-year term. The election was held alongside the 2022 Taiwanese constitutional referendum.

The election resulted in a big loss for the ruling Democratic Progressive Party as all the mayoral and magisterial political candidates in the north were defeated. Tsai Ing-wen, the incumbent President of the Republic of China, resigned as party head after the poll, triggering a by-election for the position.

Background
The Democratic Progressive Party announced in November 2021 that, prior to the 2022 elections, the party's chairperson would select candidates for mayoral posts in the special municipalities. Candidates would then be subject to approval by the party's central executive committee. Localities in which DPP-affiliated incumbents were ineligible for a third consecutive term will hold party primaries. To contest local offices held by Kuomintang members, the Democratic Progressive Party planned to host internal discussions to propose candidates and permit the party leader to nominate interested candidates for central executive committee approval. 

It was reported in September 2020 that the Kuomintang would rely on opinion polls and satisfaction surveys to nominate candidates prior to the 2022 elections. In addition to these electoral losses, proposals backed by the Kuomintang during the 2021 Taiwanese referendum also failed.

The New Power Party began naming candidates for local office in January 2022. In June, for the first time in party history, NPP-backed candidates for mayoral and magisterial posts were selected.

On 14 January 2022, the Central Election Commission announced that local elections would be held on 26 November 2022. After the death of candidate Huang Shao-tsung on 2 November 2022, the Chiayi mayoral election was rescheduled for 18 December 2022. Over 17,000 polling stations were open, from 08:00 to 16:00 on 26 November 2022, and more than 11,000 offices were contested in the election.

In the run-up to the elections, Taiwanese law enforcement carried out raids under the Anti-Infiltration Act on individuals suspected of buying votes on behalf of China.

Results
The KMT won fourteen mayoral or magisterial seats, and the DPP won five seats. Taiwan People's Party (TPP) gained their sole mayoral seat in Hsinchu City after chairman Ko Wen-je ineligible for re-election in Taipei. The election result, although broadly in line with expectations, was still a major defeat for DPP which was the worst electoral performance in the party's history. Taiwanese President Tsai Ing-wen, whose strategy to frame local elections as showing defiance to China failed, subsequently resigned as party chairwoman.

Vote summary

Elected officials and councils

Magistrate and mayor elections

Results

Councillor elections

Nominations

Results

Notes

References

2022 elections in Taiwan
November 2022 events in Asia
Local elections in Taiwan